Nejc Barič (born April 23, 1997 in Ljubljana, Slovenia) is a Slovenian professional basketball player for Split of the Adriatic League and the Croatian League. He is a 1.83 m tall point guard.

Professional career
Barič started playing professional basketball for Zlatorog Laško.

In July 2019, Barič signed with Koper Primorska. In July 2020, he signed for Krka. Barič averaged 7.7 points, 4.7 assists, and 2.4 rebounds per game. On August 18, 2021, he signed with Split of the Adriatic League and the Croatian League.

Personal life
His older sister Nika is also a professional basketball player.

References

External links
 Eurobasket.com profile
 REALGM profile

1997 births
Living people
ABA League players
KK Krka players
KK Split players
KK Zlatorog Laško players
Point guards
Slovenian men's basketball players
People from Trbovlje